Pany is a rural locality (a village) in Gamovskoye Rural Settlement, Permsky District, Perm Krai, Russia. The population was 50 as of 2010. There are 2 streets.

Geography 
Pany is located 22 km southwest of Perm (the district's administrative centre) by road. Gamovo is the nearest rural locality.

References 

Rural localities in Permsky District